is a Japanese football player currently playing for J2 League side Kashiwa Reysol.

Club statistics
Updated to 19 February 2019.

References

External links
Profile at Vissel Kobe

1988 births
Living people
Association football people from Kumamoto Prefecture
Japanese footballers
J1 League players
J2 League players
Sagan Tosu players
Vissel Kobe players
Zweigen Kanazawa players
V-Varen Nagasaki players
Kashiwa Reysol players
Association football midfielders